Jakub Wróbel (born 30 July 1993) is a Polish professional footballer who plays as a left winger for Sandecja Nowy Sącz.

Club career
On 24 August 2020, he joined Stal Mielec.

References

External links

1993 births
People from Dąbrowa Tarnowska
Sportspeople from Lesser Poland Voivodeship
Living people
Polish footballers
Association football midfielders
Unia Tarnów players
Bruk-Bet Termalica Nieciecza players
Siarka Tarnobrzeg players
Radomiak Radom players
Garbarnia Kraków players
GKS Jastrzębie players
ŁKS Łódź players
Stal Mielec players
Resovia (football) players
Sandecja Nowy Sącz players
Ekstraklasa players
I liga players
II liga players
III liga players